Denys C. Shortt OBE is a British businessman.

Early life

Shortt attended Eagle House Prep School in Surrey and Warwick School in Warwick. At Warwick School he was selected to play hockey for England at age 15. He played for England at U16, u18 and U21 levels for both indoor and outdoor hockey.

Career

Shortt founded DCS Europe plc in 1994 at his home in a stable block in Buckland, Broadway, England. In 2012 DCS employed 250 people with sales of £148 million. The company distributes health and beauty products. In 2020 DCS Group UK Ltd employed 400 people with sales of £268 million and are now headquartered in Banbury, Oxfordshire, England. The company also owns a  new toiletries factory in Redditch, Worcestershire, England. 

In 2000 he started Enable Software with co-founder Andrew Butt.  Enable Software now employs 25 with annual sales of £1.7 million. In 2021 Enable raised $45 million in a Series B funding. The company is now headquartered in San Francisco and employs over 150.

Pro-bono activities

In Dec 2010 Shortt became Chairman of the Coventry & Warwickshire Local Enterprise Partnership. He retired in May 2012.

He was on the advisory Board of Warwick Business School, and he was a Director of Stratford Town Football Club.

Shortt founded an organization "Business Supporting Stratford" to facilitate charitable donations from Stratford area businesses.

Awards

Shortt was 2000 Entrepreneur of the Year and he was presented with a Growing Business Award in 2011.

Shortt was appointed Officer of the Order of the British Empire (OBE) in the 2013 New Year Honours for services to the Economy in the West Midlands.

Personal life

Shortt is married with a son and daughter. He is a helicopter pilot. He was Chairman of the Ladykillers Hockey Club.

References

Year of birth missing (living people)
Living people
British businesspeople
British Eurosceptics